Kabita is 1977 Bengali film starring Mala Sinha.

Kabita may also refer to:
Kabita (actress) (1952–2012), Bangladeshi film actress who starred in Nil Akasher Niche